The League of Gentlemen were a band active during March–December 1980 that featured King Crimson guitarist Robert Fripp.

Background
Other members included bass guitarist Sara Lee (who later joined Gang of Four, the B-52's, and Indigo Girls), keyboardist Barry Andrews (formerly of XTC; later of Shriekback) and percussionist Johnny Elichaoff  (who is referred to on the album as "Johnny Toobad").  Elichaoff was replaced late in the band's tenure by Kevin Wilkinson (later of China Crisis and Squeeze).  

The 1980 group should not be confused with Robert Fripp's first semi-professional band in the 1960s, which had the same name.

Fripp referred to the 1980 band as "a second-division touring new wave instrumental dance band".

The Trouser Press Record Guide described the League of Gentlemen's music as typically taking "a simple medium-to-fast backbeat over which Fripp and Andrews locked horns, with melodic development emerging slowly, surely, subtly." Trouser Press also suggests that the League's foray into dance oriented rock was a precursor to Fripp's reformed King Crimson in the early 1980s.

The band toured extensively in Europe and North America throughout 1980.

There are 77 specific tour dates detailed in the sleevenotes on the  album The League of Gentlemen. Missing from this list are four (possibly warm-up) gigs at the 14th Century Hunting Lodge (now Lodge Farm House), outside the grounds of Kingston Lacy near Wimborne Minster, Dorset, England. These gigs are dated 24 to 27 February and pre-dated the first 'official' gig on 10 April at Moles, Bath.

Discography

Studio album

 The League of Gentlemen (EG/Polydor, 1981)

Live album

 Thrang Thrang Gozinbulx (constructed from bootleg recordings) (Discipline Records, 1996)

Compilation

 God Save the King (Editions EG, 1985)

Album Personnel
 Robert Fripp - guitar
 Sara Lee (musician) - bass
 Barry Andrews - organ
 Kevin Wilkinson - drums (except A4 Heptaparaparshinokh and A5 Dislocated)
 Johnny Toobad - drums on Heptaparaparshinokh and Dislocated
 Danielle Dax - vocals and lyrics ("Hamsprachtmuzic") on Minor Man; she also provided the cover artwork for the album

Notes

References

External links
discogs.com/artist: The League of Gentlemen

Musical groups established in 1980
Musical groups disestablished in 1980
English post-punk music groups
English new wave musical groups
English rock music groups
British supergroups
Rock music supergroups
New wave supergroups

Robert Fripp
Discipline Global Mobile artists